Hojamamed Hojamamedov (also Hojamamed Hojamamédow, born June 10, 1986) is a Turkmen swimmer, who specialized in sprint freestyle events. Hojamamedov qualified for the men's 50 m freestyle at the 2004 Summer Olympics in Athens, by receiving a Universality place from FINA in an entry time of 29.07. He challenged seven other swimmers in heat two, including 15-year-old Malique Williams of Antigua and Barbuda. He blasted a Turkmen record of 27.68 to earn a second spot by less than 0.07 of a second behind winner Anderson Bonabart of Micronesia. Hojamamedov failed to advance into the semifinals, as he placed seventy-second overall out of 86 swimmers in the preliminaries.

References

1986 births
Living people
Turkmenistan male freestyle swimmers
Olympic swimmers of Turkmenistan
Swimmers at the 2004 Summer Olympics